Manja Benak (born 7 February 1989) is a Slovenian football defender who plays for ZNK Olimpija Ljubljana of the Slovenian 1. Zenska Liga and the Slovenia national team. She previously played for ZNK Pomurje and Krka Novo Mesto of the 1.SZNL, representing both clubs in the UEFA Women's Champions League.

References

External links
 Profile at LUV Graz

1989 births
Living people
Slovenian women's footballers
Slovenian expatriate footballers
Slovenian expatriate sportspeople in Hungary
Slovenia women's international footballers
People from the Municipality of Miren-Kostanjevica
Expatriate women's footballers in Austria
Slovenian expatriate sportspeople in Austria
Women's association football defenders
Women's association football midfielders
Ferencvárosi TC (women) footballers
ŽNK Mura players
ŽNK Krka players
DFC LUV Graz players